Spilomyia saltuum is a species of Hoverfly in the family Syrphidae.

Distribution
Italy.

References

Eristalinae
Insects described in 1794
Taxa named by Johan Christian Fabricius
Diptera of Europe